Time Squared may refer to:

 Time Squared, two graphic novels by Howard Chaykin
 "Time Squared" (Star Trek: The Next Generation), the 39th episode of the television series Star Trek: The Next Generation
 Time Squared Academy High School, high school specializing in mathematics, engineering, and science
 Time Squared (album)